The Linden borer (Saperda vestita) is a species of beetle in the family Cerambycidae. It was described by Thomas Say in 1824. It is known from Canada and the United States. It feeds on Tilia americana.

References

vestita
Beetles described in 1824